Rowan Grant Gordon (October 13, 1900 – March 20, 1954) was a Canadian ice hockey player who competed in the 1928 Winter Olympics. He was born in Pembroke, Ontario.

In 1928, he was a member of the University of Toronto Grads, the Canadian team which won the gold medal. He later worked as a lawyer until his death in 1954.

References

External links
Grant Gordon, Canadian Olympic Committee profile
1928 Olympic Team photograph, Library and Archives Canada

1900 births
1954 deaths
Canadian ice hockey players
Ice hockey players at the 1928 Winter Olympics
Medalists at the 1928 Winter Olympics
Olympic gold medalists for Canada
Olympic ice hockey players of Canada
Olympic medalists in ice hockey
Sportspeople from Pembroke, Ontario
Toronto Varsity Blues ice hockey players